Friedler is a surname. Notable people with this surname include:

 Eric Friedler (born 1954), American tennis player
 Julien Friedler (born 1950), a writer and contemporary artist
 Sorelle Friedler, American computer scientist